is Japanese singer-songwriter Ua's fifth single, released on September 24, 1996. It served as ending theme for the TBS TV program Face. It sold 17,800 copies in its first week, debuting at #20 on the Oricon Weekly Singles Chart and becoming Ua's second top 20 entry.

Track listing

CD

Vinyl

Charts and sales

References

External links
 SPEEDSTAR RECORDS | UA 「リズム」

1996 singles
Ua (singer) songs
Songs written by Shinichi Osawa
1996 songs